Kollo Daniel Sanou (born 1 December 1951) is a Burkinabé film director as well as a screenwriter and producer of both fiction and documentary films.

Biography
Sanou was born in Borodougou in 1951. He studied at the Institut National des Arts in Abidjan, Ivory Coast for his undergraduate degree and then earned his master's degree at the Conservatoire libre du cinéma français in Paris, France.

Career
Since 1977 Sanou has directed or been the screenwriter of over 25 documentary, fiction, and animated films. He also directed the television series Taxi Brousse, serving as producer as well from 2001 to 2004.

His first film of note was Paweogo (The Immigrant), released in 1982 with production by CINAFRIC, a company set up by local businessman Martial Ouédraogo to produce and distribute local Burkinabé films. However, shortly after the completion of the film, CINAFRIC went bankrupt and had to close due to lack of investment. Paweogo would be the only film the company ever produced. The film was, however, nominated for that year's FESPACO awards, although it did not win.

Sanou served as director and screenwriter for the 2004 film Tasuma, a comedy-drama of a Burkinabé war veteran who had fought for France abroad returning to his home village. The film was well received by critics although Dave Kehr noted that the film fell back on old tropes of African cinema such as a folkloric theme and the setting of the noble village.

Filmography

Fictions 
 1978 : Beogo Naba (Chief of tomorrow) 
 1982 : Paweogo (The Immigrant)
 1992 : Jigi (Hope)
 1998 : Marcel et le médiateur du Faso (co-directed with Pierre Rouamba)
 2004 : Tasuma
 2009: Nyama (The Oath)
 2011 : Le poids du serment
 2012 : Docteur Yeelzanga
 2012 - 2016 : Affaires Publiques
 2018 Tasuma 2

Documentaries  
 1980 : Les Dodos 
 1984 : L'Artisanat et son pays
 1984 : Jubilé d'une cathédrale
 1987 : Sarraouina
 1989 : Fespaco 1989
 1987 : L'artisanat et son pays
 1991 : Siao 1991
 2000 : La Piraterie, un fléau en Afrique de l'Ouest
 2006 : Droit de mémoire (co-directed with Pierre Rouamba)
 2007 : Après l'urgence (co-directed with  Jean-Claude Frisque)
 2013 : Le Bon Riz de Madame Moui (produced with a grant from Taiwan)

Animation 
 1984 : L'Aigle et le Caméléon

Television 
 1999 - 2004 : Taxi Brousse

References

External links

1951 births
Living people
Burkinabé film directors
Burkinabé screenwriters
Burkinabé film producers
21st-century Burkinabé people